Pandanus candelabrum, also known as the chandelier tree, is a species of screw palm found in tropical Africa, notably Liberia. It only grows on kimberlite outcroppings, making it a potentially useful indicator for diamond prospecting.

References

External links

candelabrum
Taxa named by Palisot de Beauvois